Anthony Lewis De Rose (August 17, 1803 - April 16, 1836), also spelled Anthony Lewis DeRose, was an itinerant painter based in New York City.

De Rose was born in New York City and began his painting career in 1821 after a year and a half of study, partially as a student of John Rubens Smith. He exhibited a number of portraits in the National Academy of Design from 1829-1833 but contracted tuberculosis in 1834 which perhaps contributed to his early demise. Today he is perhaps best known for his watercolor portrait of Davy Crockett (1834), in the collection of the New-York Historical Society, but his works have also been exhibited in recent decades at the National Academy of Design.

References 

 A History of the Rise and Progress of the Arts of Design in the United States, Volume 3, by William Dunlap, Frank William Bayley, Charles Eliot Goodspeed, C.E. Goodspeed & Company, 1918, page 163.
 "Anthony Lewis De Rose", Paintings and Sculpture in the Collection of the National Academy of Design, 1826-1925, by David Bernard Dearinger, John Davis, Mary Lublin, Hudson Hills Press, 2004, page 153.
 "Crockett, David", Asher Brown Durand after Anthony Lewis De Rose, Checklist of the Permanent Collection, National Portrait Gallery (Smithsonian Institution), Smithsonian Institution Press, 1985, pages 68 and 450.
 Marriages and Deaths from the New Yorker (double Quarto Edition), 1836-1841, by Kenneth Scott, National Genealogical Society, 1980, page 40.

1803 births
1836 deaths
19th-century American painters